Ulster railways, present and past, include:

 Northern Ireland Railways, formerly Ulster Transport Authority

Heritage railways
 List of heritage railways in Northern Ireland

Former railway companies
Annaghmore Turf Railway
Ballycastle Railway
Belfast Central Railway
Belfast and County Down Railway and its constituents:
Belfast, Hollywood and Bangor Railway
Downpatrick, Dundrum and Newcastle Railway
Belfast and Northern Counties Railway and its constituents:
Belfast and Ballymena Railway
Ballymena, Ballymoney, Coleraine and Portrush Junction Railway
Ballymena, Cushendall and Red Bay Railway
Ballymena and Larne Railway
Carrickfergus and Larne Railway
Derry Central Railway
Draperstown Railway
Londonderry and Coleraine Railway
Limavady and Dungiven Railway
Portstewart Tramway
Belfast Harbour Commissioners
Belfast Street Tramways
Bessbrook and Newry Tramway
Carnlough Lime Company
City of Derry Tramways
County Donegal Railways Joint Committee and its constituents:
Donegal Railway
Finn Valley Railway
Strabane and Letterkenny Railway
West Donegal Railway
Clogher Valley Railway
Castlederg and Victoria Bridge Railway
Dundalk, Newry and Greenore Railway
Giant's Causeway, Portrush and Bush Valley Railway & Tramway
Glenariff Iron Ore and Harbour Company
Glenanne and Loughgilly Tramway
Great Northern Railway (Ireland) and its constituents in Ulster:
Banbridge, Lisburn and Belfast Railway
Banbridge, Newry, Dublin and Belfast Junction Railway
Belfast Central Railway
Castleblayney, Keady and Armagh Railway
Dublin and Antrim Junction Railway
Dublin and Belfast Junction Railway
Dundalk and Enniskillen Railway
Enniskillen and Bundoran Railway
Irish North Western Railway
Londonderry and Enniskillen Railway
Newry and Armagh Railway
Newry, Warrenpoint and Rostrevor Railway
Northern Railway of Ireland
Portadown, Dungannon and Omagh Railway
Town of Newry Connecting Railway
Ulster Railway
Londonderry Port and Harbour Commissioners
Londonderry and Lough Swilly Railway and its constituents:
Burtonport Extension Railway
Cardonagh Extension Railway
Letterkenny Railway
Northern Counties Committee
Sligo, Leitrim and Northern Counties Railway
Trostan Mineral Railway
Ulster Transport Authority
Warrenpoint and Rostrevor Tramway

See also

 List of narrow gauge railways in Ireland
 History of rail transport in Ireland